Felipe Nascimento (born 5 July 1993) is a Brazilian modern pentathlete. He competed at the 2016 Summer Olympics in Rio de Janeiro, in the men's event.

References

External links

1993 births
Living people
Brazilian male modern pentathletes
Olympic modern pentathletes of Brazil
Modern pentathletes at the 2016 Summer Olympics
Modern pentathletes at the 2015 Pan American Games
Pan American Games competitors for Brazil
Sportspeople from Recife
21st-century Brazilian people